The Trachichthyiformes  are an order of ray-finned fishes in the superorder Acanthopterygii.

Phylogeny
A recent phylogeny based on the work of Betancur-Rodriguez et al. 2017 shows Trachichthyiformes as a sister group of Beryciformes in the clade Berycimorpha.

References 

 Hgulichthys, nouveau genre de Lissoberycinae (Trachichthyiformes, Trachichthyoidea) du Cénomanien inférieur marin de Hgula (Liban). Implications ... O Otero, Y Dutour, M Gayet, Geobios, 1995

Ray-finned fish orders